Robert S Jarvis (born 1965) is an English television and film actor. He is best known for his roles as Eddie in Hustle the long running BBC series, Graham Shand in Luther and as Russell Posner in Emmerdale. From the Wirral, he is frequently cast as a scouser.

Partial filmography

Other Work (Voiceovers)
Rob Jarvis is also one of the two main continuity and promo voices for the National Geographic Channel, in the UK. Rob is currently the voice of the Hyundai i20, and the RNLI adverts. In 2011, he narrated series 5 of ITV's Britain's Best Dish. In September 2016, Jarvis began narrating ITV's brand new Police Documentary 'Car Wars', following Northumbria Police's Traffic and newly established Dragoon Units. He also voices Emergency Helicopter Medics for Channel 4.

References

External links
 

English male film actors
English male television actors
English male voice actors
Living people
1965 births